Freifrau Charlotte von Rothschild (13 June 1819 – 13 March 1884) was a German-born British socialite. She was a member of the Rothschild banking family of Naples.

Family 
Rothschild was born into the well known Jewish banking family, the Rothschilds. She was the eldest child and only daughter of Carl Mayer Freiherr von Rothschild (1788–1855) and Adelheid Herz (1800–1853). Her maternal grandparents were  Moses Isaac Herz (sometimes spelled Hertz) and Clara (née Salomon or Saaling.)

She was born in Frankfurt am Main, Germany on 13 June 1819. Both her parents were Jewish.

Marriage 
Because endogamy within the Rothschild family was an essential part of their strategy to ensure that control of their wealth remained in family hands, on 15 June 1836, two days after her seventeenth birthday, Rothschild married Lionel Freiherr de Rothschild (1808–1879), her first cousin from the English branch of the family. They had the following children:

 Leonora (1837–1911)
 Evelina (1839–1866)
 Nathan Mayer (1840–1915)
 Alfred Charles (1842–1918)
 Leopold (1845–1917)

The couple maintained residences at 148 Piccadilly and Gunnersbury Park in London where, in the tradition of the English family, she used the style "de" Rothschild. Rothschild's arranged marriage flourished for 43 years based on great love and mutual respect. In an era when male and female roles were clearly defined, Charlotte had been better educated in art than her husband and would be instrumental in most of their art assemblage.

In 1858, her husband became the first unconverted Jew to sit in the British House of Commons. Charlotte Freifrau de Rothschild became one of England's most prominent socialites whose dinner invitations, according to biographer Stanley Weintraub, were favoured over those from Buckingham Palace.

In 1844, the Freifrau caused a sensation in London society when the American showman P. T. Barnum and his celebrated midget "Tom Thumb" performed at her home. However, beyond socializing and entertaining, Charlotte von Rothschild was a dedicated patron of numerous charities with a special interest in education.

Death 
Rothschild died at her Gunnersbury Park home on 13 March 1884 and was buried next to her husband in the Willesden Jewish Cemetery. Following her death, her eldest son named a newly constructed block of housing for low-income persons "Charlotte's Buildings."

See also
 Rothschild banking family of England

References

External links

English socialites
English philanthropists
English art collectors
Women art collectors
19th-century German Jews
German baronesses
Charlotte von Rothschild
1819 births
1884 deaths
Burials at Willesden Jewish Cemetery
German emigrants to England
Austrian baronesses